A Perilous Journey is a 1953 American Western film directed by R. G. Springsteen and written by Richard Wormser. The film stars Vera Ralston, David Brian, Scott Brady, Charles Winninger, Hope Emerson, Eileen Christy and Leif Erickson. The film was released on April 5, 1953, by Republic Pictures.

Plot

Cast      
Vera Ralston as Francie Landreaux
David Brian as Monty Breed
Scott Brady as Shard Benton
Charles Winninger as Captain Eph Allan
Hope Emerson as Olivia Schuyler
Eileen Christy as Susan
Leif Erickson as Richards
Veda Ann Borg as Sadie
Ian MacDonald as Sprague
Virginia Grey as Abby
Dorothy Ford as Rose
Ben Cooper as Sam
Kathleen Freeman as Leah
Pat Silver as Cathy 
Paul Fierro as Pepe
Angela Greene as Mavis
John Dierkes as First Mate
Fred Graham as Whiskers

References

External links
 

1953 films
American Western (genre) films
1953 Western (genre) films
Republic Pictures films
Films directed by R. G. Springsteen
American black-and-white films
1950s English-language films
1950s American films